This is a list of Major League Baseball hit records.
Bolded names mean the player is still active and playing.

3,000 career hits

240 hits in one season

Evolution of the single season record for hits

Three or more seasons with 215+ hits

Five or more seasons with 200+ hits

100 or more hits from each side of the plate, season

League leader in hits

League leader in hits 5 or more seasons

League leader in hits 3 or more consecutive seasons

League leader in hits, three decades

League leader in hits, both leagues

League leader in hits, three different teams

Consecutive game hitting streaks of 30 or more games

Where possible, hitting streaks that extend between seasons are broken down to show when the hits occurred. For example, Keeler's (1, 44) indicates 1 hit in 1896, and 44 in 1897.

This list omits Denny Lyons of the 1887 American Association Philadelphia Athletics, who had a 52-game hitting streak. In 1887, the major leagues adopted a new rule which counted walks as hits, a rule which was dropped after that season. Lyons hit in 52 consecutive games that season, but his streak included two games (#22 and #44) in which his only "hits" were walks. In , MLB ruled that walks in 1887 would not be counted as hits, so Lyons' streak was no longer recognized, though it still appears on some lists. In 2000, Major League Baseball reversed its 1968 decision, ruling that the statistics which were recognized in each year's official records should stand, even in cases where they were later proven incorrect. Paradoxically, the ruling affects only hit totals for the year; the batting champion for the year is not recognized as the all-time leader despite having the highest single-season average under the ruling, and Lyons' hitting streak is not recognized.

Consecutive game hitting streaks to start a career

7 or more hits by an individual in one game

6 hits in a game by an individual, twice

Excluded on this list are Henry Larkin, who accomplished this with the Washington Senators in the American Association, and Ed Delahanty, with the Philadelphia Phillies in the Players' League.

3 hits by an individual in one inning

Tom Burns (September 6, 1883)
Fred Pfeffer (September 6, 1883)
Ned Williamson (September 6, 1883)
Gene Stephens (June 18, 1953)
Johnny Damon (June 27, 2003)

1,660 hits by a team in one season

See also

List of lifetime Major League Baseball hit leaders through history

Notes

References

Hit
Hit